

Qualification
A total of 56 athletes will qualify to compete at the Games (30 male, 26 female). Each country is allowed to enter a maximum of four male and four female athletes. The top 10 men's and top 9 women's teams at the 2015 Pan American Championship qualified to compete at the games. Hosts Canada will be allowed to maximum quota of four male and four female athletes.

Qualification timeline

Qualification summary

Men

Women

References

P
Qualification for the 2015 Pan American Games
Racquetball at the 2015 Pan American Games